Nyayam Meere Cheppali is a 1985 Telugu-language film starring Suman and Jayasudha. The film was a remake of a Hindi film Aaj Ki Awaz  (1984) which later remade in Tamil as Naan Sigappu Manithan by S. A. Chandrasekhar. Rajinikanth who made an extended guest appearance in this film, played the lead role in the Tamil film.

Cast
 Suman as Prabhakar, professor and Robin Hood, serial killer.
 Jayasudha as Kranti, lawyer.
 Rajinikanth as Atmaram, Inspector (Guest appearance)
 Jaggayya as Judge.
 M. Prabhakar Reddy as Sathyamurthy, Judge.
 Kanta Rao as M. Bhaskara Rao, Police Commissioner.
 Nutan Prasad as Mahanandam, Minister.
 Eeswara Rao as Suresh, Prabhakar's colleague and friend.
 Banerjee as Chidanandam.
Gulshan Grover as Dilip
Jaya Bhaskar as Attendant in Hospital

Soundtrack

References

External links
 

1985 films
1980s Telugu-language films
Telugu remakes of Hindi films
Indian vigilante films
Films scored by K. Chakravarthy
Indian rape and revenge films
1980s vigilante films